KUMX (106.7 FM) is an American radio station broadcasting an adult contemporary format. Licensed to North Fort Polk, Louisiana, United States, the station serves the area surrounding Fort Polk and Vernon parish and surrounding areas.  The station is currently owned by West Central Broadcasting

History
This station originally was assigned a Construction permit in 1988, but apparently due to delays and such did not get fully licensed until 1995. West Central Broadcasting Co., Inc., purchased the station in 2002.

References

External links

Radio stations in Louisiana
Mainstream adult contemporary radio stations in the United States
Radio stations established in 1995